John of Antioch may refer to:

People from Antioch
 John Chrysostom (c. 347–407), born in Antioch, archbishop of Constantinople
 John Scholasticus (died 577), born in Antioch, patriarch of Constantinople from 565 to 577
 John Malalas (died 578), chronicler
 John of Antioch (historian), a 7th-century monk and chronicler
 John of Antioch, marshal of Cyprus in 1247
 John of Antioch (translator), fl. 1282
 Jean II de Giblet (died 1315), Cypriot nobleman

Bishops and patriarchs of Antioch
 John I of Antioch, patriarch of Antioch from 429 to 441
 John Maron (died 707), Maronite patriarch of Antioch
 John III of the Sedre, Syrian Orthodox patriarch of Antioch from 631 to 648
 John IV of Antioch, Syrian Orthodox patriarch of Antioch from 846 to 873
 John VIII bar Abdoun, Syrian Orthodox patriarch of Antioch from 1004 to 1033
 John X bar Shushan, Syriac Orthodox patriarch of Antioch from 1063 to 1073
 John the Oxite, Greek Orthodox patriarch from 1089 to 1100
 John XI bar Mawdyono, Syriac Orthodox patriarch of Antioch from 1130 to 1137
 John XII of Antioch, Syriac Orthodox patriarch of Antioch from 1208 to 1220
 John XIII bar Ma'dani, Syriac Orthodox patriarch of Antioch from 1252 to 1263
 Ignatius John XIV, Syriac Orthodox patriarch of Antioch from 1483 to 1493
 John X of Antioch, Greek Orthodox patriarch since 2012

Princes of Antioch
John of Lusignan (died 1375), regent of Cyprus
John of Coimbra, Prince of Antioch (died 1457), husband of Charlotte of Cyprus
John II of Cyprus (died 1458), king of Cyprus, Armenia and Jerusalem